In Greek mythology, the name Caucon (Ancient Greek: Καύκων) may refer to:

Caucon, an Arcadian prince as one of the 50 sons of the impious King Lycaon either by the naiad Cyllene, Nonacris or by unknown woman. He was an ancestral hero and eponym of the Caucones that were believed to have settled in Triphylia. His tomb was shown at Lepreus, with a statue of a man with a lyre standing over it. Other traditions made him son of Poseidon and father of Lepreus by Astydameia. Caucon and his brothers were the most nefarious and carefree of all people. To test them, Zeus visited them in the form of a peasant. These brothers mixed the entrails of a child into the god's meal, whereupon the enraged Zeus threw the meal over the table. Caucon was killed, along with his brothers and their father, by a lightning bolt of the god.
Caucon, son of Celaenus and grandson of the autochthon Phlyus, from Eleusis. He was said to have brought the rites of the Great Goddesses from Eleusis to Andania in Messene. Legend had it that he appeared to Epaminondas in a dream, prophesying him success in restoration of the Messenian state; the Messenian allies of Epaminondas offered sacrifices to Caucon.

Notes

References 

 Apollodorus, The Library with an English Translation by Sir James George Frazer, F.B.A., F.R.S. in 2 Volumes, Cambridge, MA, Harvard University Press; London, William Heinemann Ltd. 1921. . Online version at the Perseus Digital Library. Greek text available from the same website.
Athenaeus of Naucratis, The Deipnosophists or Banquet of the Learned. London. Henry G. Bohn, York Street, Covent Garden. 1854. Online version at the Perseus Digital Library.
 Athenaeus of Naucratis, Deipnosophistae. Kaibel. In Aedibus B.G. Teubneri. Lipsiae. 1887. Greek text available at the Perseus Digital Library.
 Claudius Aelianus, Varia Historia translated by Thomas Stanley (d.1700) edition of 1665. Online version at the Topos Text Project.
 Claudius Aelianus, Claudii Aeliani de natura animalium libri xvii, varia historia, epistolae, fragmenta, Vol 2. Rudolf Hercher. In Aedibus B.G. Teubneri. Lipsiae. 1866.
 Greek text available at the Perseus Digital Library.
 Pausanias, Description of Greece with an English Translation by W.H.S. Jones, Litt.D., and H.A. Ormerod, M.A., in 4 Volumes. Cambridge, MA, Harvard University Press; London, William Heinemann Ltd. 1918. . Online version at the Perseus Digital Library
Pausanias, Graeciae Descriptio. 3 vols. Leipzig, Teubner. 1903.  Greek text available at the Perseus Digital Library.
 Strabo, The Geography of Strabo. Edition by H.L. Jones. Cambridge, Mass.: Harvard University Press; London: William Heinemann, Ltd. 1924. Online version at the Perseus Digital Library.
 Strabo, Geographica edited by A. Meineke. Leipzig: Teubner. 1877. Greek text available at the Perseus Digital Library.

Children of Poseidon
Sons of Lycaon
Princes in Greek mythology
Kings in Greek mythology
Arcadian characters in Greek mythology
Eleusinian characters in Greek mythology
Arcadian mythology
Messenian mythology